Xinhua Subdistrict, Xinhua Road Subdistrict, or Xinhua Avenue Subdistrict may refer to numerous locations in the People's Republic of China:

Anhui
 Xinhua Subdistrict, Fuyang, in Yingdong District

Beijing
 Xinhua Subdistrict, Beijing, in Tongzhou District

Gansu
 Xinhua Road Subdistrict, Jinchang, in Jinchuan District

Guangdong
 Xinhua Subdistrict, Guangzhou, in Huadu District
 Xinhua Subdistrict, Maoming, in Maonan District
 Xinhua Subdistrict, Shaoguan, in Wujiang District

Guizhou
 Xinhua Subdistrict, Duyun
 Xinhua Road Subdistrict, Guiyang, in Nanming District, Guiyang

Hebei
 Xinhua Avenue Subdistrict, Zhangjiakou, in Qiaoxi District
 Xinhua Road Subdistrict, Chengde, in Shuangqiao District
 Xinhua Road Subdistrict, Renqiu
 Xinhua Road Subdistrict, Shijiazhuang, in Xinhua District

Heilongjiang
 Xinhua Subdistrict, Boli County
 Xinhua Subdistrict, Daqing, in Datong District
 Xinhua Subdistrict, Harbin, in Daoli District
 Xinhua Subdistrict, Mudanjiang, in Aimin District

Henan
 Xinhua Subdistrict, Jiaozuo, in Jiefang District
 Xinhua Subdistrict, Kaifeng, in Gulou District
 Xinhua Subdistrict, Nanyang, Henan, in Wancheng District
 Xinhua Subdistrict, Zhumadian, in Yicheng District
 Xinhua Avenue Subdistrict, Hebi, in Heshan District
 Xinhua Road Subdistrict, Gongyi
 Xinhua Road Subdistrict, Xinmi
 Xinhua Road Subdistrict, Xinzheng

Hubei
 Xinhua Subdistrict, Jianghan District, in Wuhan
 Xinhua Avenue Subdistrict, Xiaogan, in Xiaonan District

Inner Mongolia
 Xinhua Subdistrict, Bayannur, in Linhe District
 Xinhua Subdistrict, Wuhai, in Haibowan District
 Xinhua Avenue Subdistrict, Ulanqab, in Jining District

Jilin
 Xinhua Subdistrict, Baicheng, in Taobei District
 Xinhua Subdistrict, Huadian
 Xinhua Subdistrict, Meihekou
 Xinhua Subdistrict, Tumen

Liaoning
 Xinhua Subdistrict, Chaoyang, Liaoning, in Longcheng District
 Xinhua Subdistrict, Fushun, in Fucheng District
 Xinhua Subdistrict, Liaoyang, in Taizihe District
 Xinhua Subdistrict, Shenyang, in Heping District
 Xinhua Subdistrict, Wafangdian
 Xinhua Subdistrict, Zhuanghe

Ningxia
 Xinhua Avenue Subdistrict, Yinchuan, in Xingqing District

Shaanxi
 Xinhua Road Subdistrict, Xi'an, in Yanliang District

Shandong
 Xinhua Subdistrict, Dezhou, in Decheng District
 Xinhua Road Subdistrict, Linqing

Shanghai
 Xinhua Road Subdistrict, Shanghai, in Changning District

Shanxi
 Xinhua Avenue Subdistrict, Datong, in Chengqu
 Xinhua Subdistrict, Jinzhong, in Yuci District